HMT Juniper (T123) was a Tree-class minesweeping trawler of the Royal Navy. She was built by Ferguson Brothers (Port Glasgow) Ltd. at Port Glasgow, launched on 15 December 1939, and commissioned on 9 March 1940.

The crew numbered 4 officers and 36 men. Armament comprised a 12pdr AA gun, three 20 mm Oerlikon AA guns, and 30 depth charges.

Juniper served in the early months of the Second World War and was sunk on 8 June 1940 in the Norwegian Sea at the close of the Norwegian Campaign. The previous day the German naval squadron under Vizeadmiral Wilhelm Marschall received Luftwaffe reports of two groups of ships. Marschall decided on his own initiative to attack the southernmost group, which was escorted by Juniper. Juniper was sunk by gunfire from Admiral Hipper.

Marschall then sent Admiral Hipper and the destroyers to Trondheim to refuel.

References

 

Tree-class trawlers
Ships built on the River Clyde
1939 ships
World War II minesweepers of the United Kingdom
World War II shipwrecks in the Norwegian Sea
Maritime incidents in June 1940